Who Killed Cock Robin (Mandarin: 目擊者, lit. "Eyewitness") is a 2017 Taiwanese neo-noir crime thriller film, written and directed by Cheng Wei-hao. The film follows a journalist who unravels a series of mysteries as he investigates a long-forgotten hit-and-run accident that occurred nine years ago. It also marked Cheng's second collaboration with Hsu Wei-ning, after The Tag-Along. The film also stars Kaiser Chuang, Ko Chia-yen, Christopher Lee and Mason Lee. It was released on March 31, 2017 in Taiwan.

Premise
Nine years ago, journalist Hsiao-chi witnessed a hit-and-run crash on a mountain road when his vehicle broke down. In that accident which happened on a stormy night, the male driver was instantly killed, and the female passenger Hsu Ai-ting fell into a coma. In a panic, Hsiao-chi took photos of the hit-and-run vehicle registration plate. However, the pictures were too blurry to be used as evidence, and therefore facts of the accident were never established. Years later, Hsiao-chi discovers that his second-hand car is connected to that accident and he begins his search for the truth behind this long forgotten case.

Cast
Kaiser Chuang as Wang Yi-chi (Hsiao-chi), journalist
Hsu Wei-ning as Maggie, journalist and Hsiao-chi's supervisor
Ko Chia-yen as Hsu Ai-ting, car accident survivor
Christopher Lee as Chiu Ching-kai (Chiu-ge), chief editor
Mason Lee as Chou Cheng-wei (A-wei), junior police officer
Cheng Chih-wei as A-chi, car mechanic
Ian Chen as Liao Tzu-fan, Hsu's boyfriend
Tang Chih-wei as Chung-wen
Mario Pu as Wang

Production
Principal photography on the film began in March 2016. Filming wrapped up one and a half months later. Much of the film was shot using a handheld camera, with the intention of
conveying the realist setting. The director stated: "by using such a technique it makes the audiences feel as if they were the witnesses themselves."

Soundtrack

Awards and nominations

References

External links

 

2017 films
Taiwanese crime thriller films
2017 crime thriller films
2010s mystery thriller films
Films directed by Cheng Wei-hao
2010s Mandarin-language films